The Stop River is a low and marshy stream in Medfield, Massachusetts, and partly forming the border between Norfolk and Walpole. The river rises near Highland Lake in Norfolk, flows  northwards to join the Charles River in Medfield, and ultimately drains into Boston Harbor.

The Medfield Rhododendrons reservation, operated by The Trustees of Reservations, is an important and rare stand of Rhododendron maximum along the river in Woodridge Street, Medfield.

References 

 New England Wadeable Streams (NEWS)
 Painting of river (Philip Juras)

Rivers of Norfolk County, Massachusetts
Rivers of Massachusetts